Vistla is a village in Tapa Parish, Lääne-Viru County, in northeastern Estonia. In 2000, Vistla had a population of 27.

References

Villages in Lääne-Viru County